Ahmet Taşyürek (born 6 July 1972) is a Turkish football manager. He is the manager of 52 Orduspor.

References

1972 births
Living people
Turkish football managers
Hatayspor managers
Şanlıurfaspor managers
Boluspor managers
Ümraniyespor managers
Karşıyaka S.K. managers